Donald MacKinnon may refer to:
Donald MacKinnon (Celtic scholar) (1839–1914), Scottish Celtic scholar
Donald Alexander MacKinnon (1863–1928), Canadian politician and author
Donald M. MacKinnon (1913–1994), Scottish philosopher and theologian
Donald Mackinnon (1859–1932), Australian politician
Donald James Mackinnon (1928–2017), his grandson, Australian politician
Donald W. MacKinnon (1903–1987), American psychologist
Donald MacKinnon (cricketer) (1842–1931), Scottish cricketer
Donald Mackinnon (diplomat) (1892–1965), Australian public servant and diplomat

See also
Don McKinnon (disambiguation)